Foster Cummings (born in 1973) is a Trinidad and Tobago politician representing the People's National Movement. He has served as a Member of Parliament in the House of Representatives for La Horquetta/Talparo since the 2020 general election. He is the current Minister of Youth Development and National Service and General Secretary for the People's National Movement.

Early life 
Cummings was born in 1973 and grew up in Indian Trail, Couva. His father is a cane-cutter and his mother is a market vendor. From a young age, Cummings helped his mother sell provisions at the market in Couva. He attended the Tortuga RC, Milton Presbyterian, Couva Junior Secondary and Carapichaima Senior Comprehensive schools. He attended the Cipriani College of Labour and Co-operative Studies, receiving an associate degree in co-operative studies. He then received a bachelors of science in political science and government from the University of the West Indies at St. Augustine.

Cummings began his business career in 1998 and became involved in multiple retail businesses, as well as focusing on the construction and real estate development industries. He is a founding member of the Heliconia Foundation for Young Professionals. He has also worked as a commissioner for the Port Authority of Trinidad and Tobago and as a Cooperative Officer at the Ministry of Labour and Cooperatives.

Political career 
Cummings first joined the Couva South Youth League for the People's National Movement (PNM) in 1989 when he was sixteen. He then became the chairman of the Couva South constituency when he was nineteen, the youngest member of PNM to hold the position. He later served as the chairman of the La Horquetta/Talparo constituency. Throughout his involvement with the party, Cummings has served as the PNM's national male youth officer and then a field officer, an election officer, and is the current general secretary. He has been part of the PNM's General Council for thirty years.

Cummings was first appointed as a temporary Government Senator in the Senate of Trinidad and Tobago on 15 January 2008, a position that he held until 6 April 2010. He then served as a temporary Opposition Senator from 18 June 2010 until 24 June 2014 when the People's Partnership coalition took control of Parliament in the 2010 general election. He was made a permanent Government Senator from 23 September 2015 to 31 December 2019. While a senator, he served on the Public Accounts (Enterprises) Committee, the Government Assurances Committees, the Committee on State Enterprises, and the Public Administration and Appropriation Committee. Cummings was appointed as the Parliamentary Secretary in the Ministry of Rural Development and Local Government on 1 January 2020.

He was first elected to the House of Representatives on 10 August 2010, following the 2020 general election where he ran as the PNM candidate for the constituency of La Horquetta/Talparo. Cummings was appointed Minister of Works and Transport on 19 August 2020 and then reassigned to be Minister of Youth Development and National Service on 19 April 2021.

Personal life 
Cummings is married and has six daughters and a son. He is a Spiritual Baptist.

References 

Living people
1973 births
University of the West Indies alumni
People's National Movement politicians
Members of the House of Representatives (Trinidad and Tobago)
Government ministers of Trinidad and Tobago
21st-century Trinidad and Tobago politicians